McGill, MacGill, Macgill or Magill is a Scottish and Irish surname, an Anglicisation of the Gaelic Mac an Ghoill, meaning "son of the stranger". In the 2000 United States Census the surname was ranked the 1,218th most common.

People
 Alexander McGill (disambiguation)
 Andrew Ryan McGill (1840–1905), American politician
 Anthony McGill (born 1991), Scottish professional snooker player
 Anthony McGill (musician) (born 1979), American clarinetist
 Arnold Robert McGill (1905–1988), Australian ornithologist
 Bill McGill (1939–2014), American basketball player
 Bob McGill (born 1962), Canadian ice hockey player
 Brendan McGill (born 1981), Irish footballer
 Bruce McGill (born 1950), American actor
 Charlie MacGill (1916–1999), Australian cricketer
 Charles McGill (1964–2017), American sculptor
 Charlie McGill (1903–1988), Scottish footballer
Claire McGill, British politician
 David McGill (disambiguation) 
 Donald McGill (1875–1962), British author and postcard artist
 Eddie McGill (born 1960), American football player
 Elsie MacGill (1905–1980), aeronautical engineer and aircraft designer
 Eric McGill (born 1987), Irish footballer
 Eric McGill (basketball) (born 1996), American basketball player
 Everett McGill (born 1945), American actor
 Frances Gertrude McGill (1882–1959), pioneering Canadian forensic pathologist and criminologist
 George McGill (1879–1963) American politician
 George McGill (Arkansas politician), American politician
 George McGill (RCAF officer) (1918–1944), Royal Canadian Air Force officer
 Gillis MacGill (1928–2013), fashion model and agent
 Helen Gregory MacGill (1864–1947), Canadian judge
 James MacGill (died 1579), Scottish politician
 James McGill (1744–1813), Scottish-born Canadian businessman and philanthropist
 Jill McGill (born 1972) American golfer
 Jimmy McGill (disambiguation)
 Jason McGill (born 1966), English football chairman
 John McGill (disambiguation)
 Josephine McGill (1877–1919), American composer and music historian
 Mike McGill (born 1964), American skateboarder
 Moyna Macgill (1895–1975), Irish actor
 Ollie McGill (born 1981), member of Australian band The Cat Empire
 Ormond McGill (1913–2005), American stage hypnotist, magician and instructor
 Patrick MacGill (1889–1963), Irish writer known as "The Navvy Poet"
 Paddy McGill (1913–1977), Irish politician and journalist
 Pearl McGill (1894-1924), American activist for equal pay in Muscatine, Iowa
 Peter MacGill, American gallerist and curator
 Peter McGill (1789–1860), mayor of Montreal
 Ralph McGill (1898–1969), American journalist
 Rickey McGill (born 1997) American basketball player
Roderick McGill (1888-1968), member of the Mississippi House of Representatives
 Rollee McGill (1931–2000), American R&B musician
 Ryan McGill (born 1969) Canadian ice hockey player
 Samuel Ford McGill (1815–1871), Liberian politician and physician
 Scott McGill (footballer) (born 2002), Scottish footballer
 Stuart MacGill (born 1971), Australian cricketer
 Tom McGill (born 2000), English footballer
 Terry MacGill (born 1945), Australian cricketer
 Urias McGill (c. 1823–1866), Liberian businessman
 William McGill (disambiguation)

Fictional characters
 Chuck McGill, fictional television character, Better Call Saul
 Lynn McGill, fictional character played by Sean Astin in the 5th season of the television drama series 24
 McGill, anti-hero of the 1960s series Man in a Suitcase, whose first name is never disclosed
 Stacey McGill, a character from The Baby-sitters Club book series
 Jimmy McGill (a.k.a. Saul Goodman), a character from series Breaking Bad and Better Call Saul
 Maggie M'Gill, a song by The Doors
 Tess McGill, lead character played by Melanie Griffith in the 1988 movie Working Girl

References

See also
 
 
 Magill (disambiguation)
 Megill
 MacGillivray
 McGillivray (disambiguation)
 MacGill-Eain (disambiguation)